Mamoru Okochi  is a Japanese mixed martial artist.

Mixed martial arts record

|-
| Win
| align=center| 10-13-2
| Hiroharu Matsufuji
| TKO (punches)
| Shooto: 11/30 in Kitazawa Town Hall
| 
| align=center| 2
| align=center| 2:30
| Setagaya, Japan
| 
|-
| Loss
| align=center| 9-13-2
| Yuki Shojo
| Decision (unanimous)
| Shooto 2006: 5/28 in Kitazawa Town Hall
| 
| align=center| 2
| align=center| 5:00
| Setagaya, Japan
| 
|-
| Loss
| align=center| 9-12-2
| Takahiro Hosoi
| TKO (punches)
| Shooto - Soulful Fight
| 
| align=center| 1
| align=center| 1:51
| Setagaya, Japan
| 
|-
| Loss
| align=center| 9-11-2
| Kimihito Nonaka
| Decision (unanimous)
| Shooto - R.E.A.D. 12
| 
| align=center| 3
| align=center| 5:00
| Tokyo, Japan
| 
|-
| Loss
| align=center| 9-10-2
| Baret Yoshida
| Decision (majority)
| Shooto - R.E.A.D. 10
| 
| align=center| 3
| align=center| 5:00
| Tokyo, Japan
| 
|-
| Loss
| align=center| 9-9-2
| Alexandre Franca Nogueira
| Decision (unanimous)
| Shooto - R.E.A.D. 3
| 
| align=center| 3
| align=center| 5:00
| Kadoma, Osaka, Japan
| 
|-
| Draw
| align=center| 9-8-2
| Yoshiyuki Takayama
| Draw
| Shooto - Gateway to the Extremes
| 
| align=center| 2
| align=center| 5:00
| Setagaya, Japan
| 
|-
| Loss
| align=center| 9-8-1
| Naoya Uematsu
| TKO (punches)
| Shooto - Shooter's Soul
| 
| align=center| 2
| align=center| 1:22
| Setagaya, Japan
| 
|-
| Draw
| align=center| 9-7-1
| Yoshiyuki Takayama
| Draw
| Shooto - Shooter's Dream
| 
| align=center| 2
| align=center| 5:00
| Setagaya, Japan
| 
|-
| Loss
| align=center| 9-7
| Hisao Ikeda
| Decision (unanimous)
| Shooto - Gig '98 2nd
| 
| align=center| 3
| align=center| 5:00
| Tokyo, Japan
| 
|-
| Loss
| align=center| 9-6
| Uchu Tatsumi
| Decision (unanimous)
| Shooto - Reconquista 1
| 
| align=center| 5
| align=center| 3:00
| Tokyo, Japan
| 
|-
| Win
| align=center| 9-5
| Anthony Lange
| Decision (majority)
| Shooto - Vale Tudo Junction 2
| 
| align=center| 5
| align=center| 3:00
| Tokyo, Japan
| 
|-
| Win
| align=center| 8-5
| Satoshi Fukuoka
| Technical Submission (triangle choke)
| Shooto - Vale Tudo Access 3
| 
| align=center| 1
| align=center| 1:02
| Tokyo, Japan
| 
|-
| Loss
| align=center| 7-5
| Kenichi Tanaka
| Submission (arm-triangle choke)
| Shooto - Vale Tudo Access 1
| 
| align=center| 1
| align=center| 2:51
| Tokyo, Japan
| 
|-
| Win
| align=center| 7-4
| Tomoyuki Saito
| Submission (armbar)
| Shooto - Shooto
| 
| align=center| 1
| align=center| 2:43
| Tokyo, Japan
| 
|-
| Win
| align=center| 6-4
| Tadashi Murakami
| Decision (unanimous)
| Shooto - Shooto
| 
| align=center| 5
| align=center| 3:00
| Tokyo, Japan
| 
|-
| Loss
| align=center| 5-4
| Takeshi Miyanaga
| Decision (unanimous)
| Shooto - Shooto
| 
| align=center| 3
| align=center| 3:00
| Tokyo, Japan
| 
|-
| Loss
| align=center| 5-3
| Kazuhiro Sakamoto
| Submission (kimura)
| Shooto - Shooto
| 
| align=center| 3
| align=center| 0:35
| Tokyo, Japan
| 
|-
| Win
| align=center| 5-2
| Tadashi Murakami
| Decision (unanimous)
| Shooto - Shooto
| 
| align=center| 3
| align=center| 3:00
| Tokyo, Japan
| 
|-
| Win
| align=center| 4-2
| Takashi Nishizawa
| Submission (triangle choke)
| Shooto - Shooto
| 
| align=center| 1
| align=center| 0:00
| Tokyo, Japan
| 
|-
| Win
| align=center| 3-2
| Akiyuki Takatsuka
| Decision (unanimous)
| Shooto - Shooto
| 
| align=center| 3
| align=center| 3:00
| Tokyo, Japan
| 
|-
| Loss
| align=center| 2-2
| Suguru Shigeno
| Decision (unanimous)
| Shooto - Shooto
| 
| align=center| 3
| align=center| 3:00
| Tokyo, Japan
| 
|-
| Win
| align=center| 2-1
| Misaki Kubota
| Decision (unanimous)
| Shooto - Shooto
| 
| align=center| 3
| align=center| 3:00
| Tokyo, Japan
| 
|-
| Loss
| align=center| 1-1
| Tomoyuki Saito
| Submission (rear-naked choke)
| Shooto - Shooto
| 
| align=center| 2
| align=center| 0:00
| Tokyo, Japan
| 
|-
| Win
| align=center| 1-0
| Makoto Mizoguchi
| Submission (rear-naked choke)
| Shooto - Shooto
| 
| align=center| 2
| align=center| 0:00
| Tokyo, Japan
|

See also
List of male mixed martial artists

References

External links
 
 Mamoru Okochi at mixedmartialarts.com
 Mamoru Okochi at fightmatrix.com

Japanese male mixed martial artists
Flyweight mixed martial artists
Featherweight mixed martial artists
Bantamweight mixed martial artists
Living people
Year of birth missing (living people)